Chigwell is a residential locality in the local government area (LGA) of Glenorchy in the Hobart LGA region of Tasmania. The 2016 census recorded a population of 2002 for the state suburb of Chigwell.

It is a suburb in the 'northern suburbs' area of Hobart. The suburb is situated between the suburbs of Berriedale, Claremont and Glenlusk. The suburb shares its border with Berriedale along the Brooker Highway and the streets north of Berriedale Rd. Until the late 1990s, the suburb boundary was closer to the main road.

The suburb shares with adjacent suburbs a range of older houses and properties.

The area was originally made up of public housing, however much of the public housing stock has now been sold to private owners.  The suburb is considered as a middle class socio-economic area, typical of many of the suburbs within Glenorchy City Council.

Chigwell primary school had its name changed to the Mt Faulkner primary school.

It is the location of the Metro Claremont home ground.

History 
Chigwell was gazetted as a locality in 1956.

Geography
Most of the boundaries are survey lines.

Road infrastructure
National Route 1 (Brooker Highway) runs along the eastern boundary.

Notes

Localities of City of Glenorchy